The following list includes settlements, geographic features, and political subdivisions of Colorado whose names are derived from Native American languages.

Listings

Counties

 Arapahoe County – named after the Arapahoe people.
 Village of Arapahoe
 Arapahoe City
 Cheyenne County – named after the Cheyenne people.
 Village of Cheyenne Wells
 Cheyenne Mountain State Park
 Kiowa County
 Montezuma County – named after the eponymous Aztec chief.
 Montezuma
 Montezuma Creek
 Ouray County
 City of Ouray
 Mount Ouray
 Saguache County – possibly from Ute terms meaning "sand dune", "blue earth", "blue water", or "green place"
 City of Saguache
 Saguache Creek
 Yuma County – named after the Yuma people.
 City of Yuma

Settlements

 Cheraw
 Chipita Park
 Cascade-Chipita Park
 Comanche Creek – named after the Comanche people.
 Cotopaxi – named after the Cotopaxi volcano in Ecuador.
 Dakota Ridge – named after the Dakota people.
 Erie – named after Erie, Pennsylvania
 Fort Massachusetts named after the state of Massachusetts.
 Fort Namaqua
 Fort Uncompahgre – from the Ute word for "red lake"
 Uncompahgre River
 Uncompahgre Wilderness
 Uncompahgre Peak
 Uncompahgre Plateau
 Uncompahgre National Forest
 Uncompahgre Gorge
 Genesee
 Kinikinik – named after the kinnickinnick plant.
 Kiowa – named after the Kiowa people.
 Kiowa Creek
 Kokomo – named after Kokomo, Indiana.
 Manitou Springs
 Niwot – named after Chief Niwot.
 Olathe – named after Olathe, Kansas.
 Pagosa Springs
 Peoria – named after the Peoria people.
 Shawnee – named after the Shawnee people.
 Southern Ute – named after the Southern Ute people.
 Towaoc
 Yampa – named after the Snake Indian word for perideridia.
 Yampa River
 Yampa River State Park

Bodies of water

 Apishapa River – Ute word for "smelly".
 North Fork Apishapa River
 Arikaree River – named after the Arikara people.
 North Fork Arikaree River
 Arkansas River – named after the state of Arkansas.
 South Arkansas River
 East Fork Arkansas River
 North Fork South Arkansas River
 Middle Fork South Arkansas River
 Arkansas Headwaters Recreation Area
 Canadian River – named after the country of Canada.
 North Fork Canadian River
 South Fork Canadian River
 Canadian River (North Platte River tributary)
 Chamita River
 Cochetopa Creek
 Illinois River named after the state of Illinois.
 Michigan River – named after the state of Michigan.
 North Fork Michigan River
 South Fork Michigan River
 Dry Fork Michigan River
 Navajo River – named after the Navajo people.
 Little Navajo River
 East Fork Navajo River
 Navajo State Park
 Pawnee Creek – named after the Pawnee people.
 Pawnee National Grassland
 Piceance Creek – from the Shoshone word piasonittsi, meaning "tall grass".
 Rio Chama
 West Fork Rio Chama
 East Fork Rio Chama
 Tennessee Creek – named after the state of Tennessee.
 Tomichi Creek

Other

 Amache National Historic Site – named after Amache Prowers.
 Mount Antero – named after Antero, a Ute chief.
 Arapaho National Wildlife Refuge
 Comanche National Grassland named after the Comanche people.
 Comanche Peak Wilderness
 Neota Wilderness
 Rawah Wilderness
 Weminuche Wilderness named after the Weminuche people.

See also
 List of place names in the United States of Native American origin

References

Citations

Sources

 

 
History of Colorado
Colorado geography-related lists
Colorado